Callisthenes may refer to:
 Callisthenes, a Greek historian
 Callisthenes (Seleucid), a Syrian who was suspected of the burning of the gates of Herod's Temple 
 Callisthenes, a subgenus of ground beetles in the genus Calosoma.